Karamalahi or Karam Alahi may refer to:

Karamalahi, Delfan
Karam Alahi, Selseleh
 Karamolla, Hınıs